This is a list of mosques in the Maldives. The first mosques built in the Maldives were initially made of materials that easy degraded over time such as wood, coconut, and palm leaves. Later on, by the middle of the 17th to early 19th centuries, Maldivian coral stone mosque architecture developed and flourished. Due to the country's proximity with the Arabian peninsula, Arabian onion-dome mosque architecture soon replaced the majority of indigenous Maldivian coral stone mosques by the middle of the 19th century. Today, only six Maldivian coral stone mosques are in good condition, all of which are listed as UNESCO Tentative Sites under the nomination name of Coral Stone Mosques of Maldives.

Coral stone mosques
Coral stone mosques are ancient mosques of Maldives built with interlocking mechanisms that mainly consist of coral stones. They are unique architectural structures not seen in any other part of the world.

Modern mosques

See also
 Islam in the Maldives
 Lists of mosques

References

External links

 
Maldives
Mosques